Kopaihorod is an urban-type settlement in Zhmerynka Raion of Vinnytsia Oblast in Ukraine. It is located on the banks of the Nemiia, a left tributary of the Dniester. Kopaihorod hosts the administration of Kopaihorod settlement hromada, one of the hromadas of Ukraine. Population: 

Until 18 July 2020, Kopaihorod belonged to Bar Raion. The raion was abolished in July 2020 as part of the administrative reform of Ukraine, which reduced the number of raions of Vinnytsia Oblast to six. The area of Bar Raion was merged into Zhmerynka Raion.

Economy

Transportation
It is on the railway line connecting Zhmerynka and Mohyliv-Podilskyi. There is infrequent passenger traffic.

The settlement has access to Highway M21 connecting Vinnytsia and Mohyliv-Podilskyi.

References

Urban-type settlements in Zhmerynka Raion